Həftəsov (also, Hərtəsou, Hərtəsov, Gaftasiab, Gaftasiyab, and Gaftasov) is a village and municipality in the Ismailli Rayon of Azerbaijan, approximately  north of Lahic.  It has a population of 71.

References 

Populated places in Ismayilli District